Here follows a list of notable alumni, faculty, administrators, or people affiliated with Loyola University Maryland.

List

Academic
Emory Elliott, Professor of American literature and advocate for expanding the literary canon to include a more diverse range of voices
Aloysius C. Galvin, S.J., former Loyola College dean, 17th president of the University of Scranton

Business
Harry Markopolos (1981), former chief investment officer of Rampart Investment Management Co. and early whistleblower of Bernard Madoff

Judges
Robert A. Zarnoch, Judge of the Maryland Court of Special Appeals

Politicians
 R. Karl Aumann (1982), former Maryland Secretary of State
 Robert C. Baldwin, former Maryland Delegate
Alessandra Biaggi (born 1986), New York State Senator
 Francis B. Burch (1941), former Attorney General of Maryland
 Andrew J. Burns Jr. (1950), former Maryland delegate
 Jill P. Carter, member, Maryland House of Delegates
 Edward L. Cochran (1949), Howard County Executive, 1974–1978
 Jean B. Cryor (1979), former Maryland Delegate
 Terry R. Gilleland, Jr., former member of Maryland House of Delegates
 C. Stuart Knudsen (1949), former member of Maryland House of Delegates
 Hugh Meade (1929), U.S. Congressman for Maryland 2nd District, 1947–1949
 Barbara Mikulski (Mount Saint Agnes College, 1958), United States Senator from Maryland, 1987–2017
 John S. Morgan (1984), former member of Maryland House of Delegates, 1991–1999
 Herbert O'Conor (1917), Governor of Maryland 1939–1947, United States Senator 1947–1953
 Michael Peroutka, former Constitution Party candidate for President
 Dennis F. Rasmussen (1970), Baltimore County Executive, 1986–1990
 Bryan Simonaire (2005), Maryland State Senator

Religion
Soane Patita Paini Mafi, Catholic Bishop and Cardinal of Tonga
Joseph C. Martin, Roman Catholic priest, recovering alcoholic and renowned speaker/educator on the issues of alcoholism and drug addiction
Noah Weinberg, rabbi

Science
Brendan Carr (physician), Endowed System Chair of Emergency Medicine at the Icahn School of Medicine at Mount Sinai
Edwin A. Fleishman, notable scientist and author
Michael D. Griffin, administrator of NASA
Bradley M. Kuhn, former Executive Director of the Free Software Foundation, Phi Beta Kappa Society 1995
Elena Plante, speech-language pathologist and Head of the Department of Speech, Language, and Hearing Sciences at the University of Arizona
Patrick E. Cavalli, Professor of Engineering; leading designer of HVAC systems used throughout the developing world; recipient of IEEE Simon Ramo Medal in 1997

Arts and literature
Mark Bowden, B.A. 1973, journalist and author (Black Hawk Down)
Ed Burns, producer, screenwriter, and novelist; co-creator with writing partner David Simon of The Corner and The Wire (HBO); former Baltimore police detective for the Homicide and Narcotics divisions; public school teacher
Tom Clancy, B.A. 1969, author
George Herman, B.A. 1950, playwright (A Company of Wayward Saints)
Deborah Rudacille, writer
Steven B. Smith, poet

Sports
Michael Burke, former soccer player
Paul Cantabene (1993), former professional lacrosse player; head coach of Stevenson University's men's lacrosse team
Frank Cashen (1945), General Manager of the Baltimore Orioles and New York Mets, won 1986 World Series
Harry Child, former Major League Baseball pitcher with the Washington Senators
Diane Geppi-Aikens (1984), women's college lacrosse coach
Katie Hoff, swimmer who holds the world record for the women's 400m individual medley; former student and volunteer assistant swimming coach
Milos Kocic (2008), goalkeeper for D.C. United and Toronto FC
Christof Lindenmayer (1999), retired professional soccer player for the Columbus Crew; assistant men's soccer coach at the university 
Mike Malone, Sacramento Kings head coach
Jim McKay (1943), sports broadcaster, winner of 13 Emmy Awards
Doug Miller, former professional soccer player; current youth soccer coach
Mike Morrison, drafted by the Phoenix Suns in the 2nd round (24th pick, 51st overall) of the 1989 NBA draft
Gordie Mueller, relief pitcher for the Boston Red Sox who played only one season in 1950
Jimmy Patsos, former head men's basketball coach, 2004–2013
Michael Phelps, swimmer with eight Olympic medals; former volunteer assistant swimming coach
Skip Prosser, former men's basketball coach, 1993–94
Philip Scholz, S-11 category swimmer; set multiple American Paralympic records
Zach Thornton (1998), goalkeeper for the New York/New Jersey MetroStars, Chicago Fire and Chivas USA
Joe Wise, Paralympian swimmer
Dennis Wit, retired U.S. national soccer player

Music
Charlie Murphy, singer-songwriter and political activist.
David Villa, singer and songwriter for Silver Edition
Jah Works, roots reggae band formed by a group of Loyola students on a study abroad program in Belgium

References

Loyola University Maryland people
Loyola University Maryland